"Hey Sexy Lady" is a song recorded by Jamaican-American reggae artist Shaggy. It was released in November 2002 as the first single from his album Lucky Day. The song features Brian and Tony Gold and the song uses the Sexy Lady Explosion riddim with additional beats. As of August 2014, it was the 110th best-selling single of the 21st century in France, with 287,000 units sold.

Versions of the song and track listing
Originally, the album has two versions of the song. The Album Version and the "Org. Sting Intl. Mix" version featuring dancehall artist Sean Paul. A collection of song versions is also found together on a separate EP. One can be found on the Yahoo!'s LAUNCHcast with the instrumentals.

Original Version (feat. Brian and Tony Gold)
Org. Sting Intl Mix (feat. Brian and Tony Gold and Sean Paul)
Dancehall Version (feat. Brian and Tony Gold and Sean Paul)
Uses the original Sexy Lady Explosion riddim
Put It On Me Just Blaze Remix (feat. Brian and Tony Gold)
Remix by Just Blaze
Riddim Driven Remix (feat. Brian and Tony Gold, Sean Paul, and Will Smith)
Two versions of the remix exists:
a new verse by Shaggy with an alternative beat
the original verse by Shaggy with a beatbox before Will Smith's verse
Spanish Fly Radio (feat. Brian and Tony Gold)
Used as the single mix in some territories. A re-edited video also exists for this version

In popular culture
Robert Bassam, founder and CEO of Easterns Automotive Group, made a commercial for his dealerships called Eastern Motors, based in the DMV area, which used an instrumental version of the song featuring athletes and celebrities such as: LaVar Arrington, Brendan Haywood, Clinton Portis, and Carmelo Anthony. The song was featured in the 2003 film Kangaroo Jack, after the mirage scene, and in the 2006 film She's the Man.

This song resurfaced into popularity again after a fan of Chilean-born American actor Pedro Pascal created a short fan video of Pascal's character, Agent Whiskey from the film Kingsman: The Golden Circle that went viral on video sharing service TikTok using this song, and thus, this song is now associated with the actor.

Charts

Weekly charts

Year-end charts

Certifications

References

Shaggy (musician) songs
2002 singles
Reggae songs
MCA Records singles
2002 songs
Songs written by Shaggy (musician)